Miloslav Příhoda (16 February 1923 – 22 August 1998) was a Czechoslovak boxer. He competed in the men's middleweight event at the 1948 Summer Olympics.

References

External links
 

1923 births
1998 deaths
Czechoslovak male boxers
Olympic boxers of Czechoslovakia
Boxers at the 1948 Summer Olympics
Place of birth missing
Middleweight boxers